Freshwater shrimp are any shrimp which live in fresh water.

This includes:
Any Caridea (shrimp) which live in fresh water, especially the family Atyidae
Species in the genus Macrobrachium
Macrobrachium ohione, the Ohio River shrimp
Macrobrachium carcinus, sometimes called the American giant freshwater prawn
Macrobrachium rosenbergii, also known as the giant river prawn, giant freshwater prawn or cherabin

Any amphipod living in fresh water, especially:
Gammarus pulex

Former disambiguation pages converted to set index articles